Björn Höhne (born 27 March 1991) is a German volleyball player who is the member of the German national team and currently plays for Belgian volleyball team Noliko Maaseik.

Career 
Höhne began his volleyball career at Berliner TSC. Later he joined the VC Olympia and was appointed to the German junior national team. He led the under-21 team as a captain for FIVB Volleyball Men's U21 World Championship 2011 in Brazil, where it reached the 10th place. Subsequently, the external attacker was from the Bundesliga Berlin Recycling Volleys, where he became a champion in 2012-13 season. In 2013 Björn Höhne had his first six appearances in the senior team and he finished in 6th place at the 2013 Men's European Volleyball Championship in Denmark and Poland. He had then moved on to Premier League rivals TV Bühl. In 2014 he joined the Belgian volleyball team Noliko Maaseik.

Sporting achievements

National team
 2015  European Games

References

External links
 
 

1991 births
Living people
German men's volleyball players
German expatriate sportspeople in Belgium
Expatriate volleyball players in Belgium
Volleyball players from Berlin
Volleyball players at the 2015 European Games
European Games medalists in volleyball
European Games gold medalists for Germany
German expatriate sportspeople in Romania
Expatriate volleyball players in Romania